Afratakht or Afra Takht may refer to:
 Afratakht, Babolsar
 Afratakht, Mahmudabad
 Afra Takht, Qaem Shahr